Goose Hill Road Historic District is a national historic district located at Cold Spring Harbor in Suffolk County, New York.  The district has 11 contributing buildings.    It is a small agrarian enclave situated along both sides of a narrow, winding road.  The dwellings date from the late 18th to mid-19th century.

It was added to the National Register of Historic Places in 1985.

References

External links
Goose Hill Road Historic District Map (Living Places)

Historic districts on the National Register of Historic Places in New York (state)
Federal architecture in New York (state)
Historic districts in Suffolk County, New York
National Register of Historic Places in Suffolk County, New York
National Register of Historic Places in Huntington (town), New York